Thomas Wilson (1773 – 9 May 1858) was a Tyneside poet, from Low Fell in Gateshead. His most famous work, written in the Geordie dialect, is The Pitman's Pay, originally published between 1826 and 1830.

Early life 
Wilson, was born on 14 November 1773 at Low Fell, now a suburb of Gateshead into a very poor family. Like many from the North East, he began his working life down the mines at one of the many local pits, starting as a  trapper-boy at around the age of around 8 or 9 years old. He had the determination to better himself, and wanted to improve his life and so studied, educating himself to a high standard, before moving on to become a schoolmaster at an early age.

Later life 
After a short stay in this job, he moved to a clerkship on Newcastle's Quayside.

In 1803, Wilson followed this with a move to join a Tyneside engineering company run by Mr John Losh. He became a partner in the company in 1807 and the partnership changed its name to Losh, Wilson and Bell, manufacturer of alkali and iron.

In 1826 the first part of his most famous song The Pitman's Pay was published in a Newcastle magazine. Subsequent parts appeared over the next two years. Other well-known works include The Weshin’ Day; his last poem was The Market Day.

Wilson never lost his love of the area, or its people. He moved to Fell House, close to his birthplace, and spent the remainder of his long life there. He went on to write many other songs and pieces of prose, usually in the Geordie dialect; these were mostly published by George Routledge & Sons.

Wilson died on 9 May 1858 at the age of 85 and is buried in St Johns Church Sheriff Hill Gateshead. A philanthropist, he was responsible for the erection of a building in Low Fell in 1841 which provided reading rooms, a schoolroom and a lecture theatre for the working classes. A social club in the Low Fell area is named after him.

Works
The Pitman's Pay
Stanzas on the Intended New Line of Road from Potticar-Lane to Leyburn-Hole
The Oiling of Dicky's Wig
The Opening of the Newcastle and Carlisle Railway
The Captain's and the Quayside
A Keelman's Tribute to a Friend
A Dirge on the Death of Coaly
Joyce's Patent Stove
The Humble Petition of the Sand Banks in the Tyne
The Alderman's Lament
The Pea-jacket
The Movement
A Glance at Polly Technic
Lines on John Smith
The Author's Arm-chair
The Author's Favourite Dog, Pincher
On Parting with a Favourite Mare
A Character
Charley the Newsmonger
On Seeing a Mouse Run Across the Road in January
Petition of an Apple-tree
Answer to the Foregoing
The Tippling Dominie
The Washing-day (or The Weshin' Day)
Woman
David Profit
Carter's Well
The Industrious and Peaceable Pair
The Village-howdy
The Happy Home

Notes
Gateshead Borough Council plans to erect a Blue plaque to commemorate "Thomas Wilson (1774-1858) Poet, Teacher and Business Man".

There is also a CIU Working Men's Club in the Low Fell area named after him.

References

External links

FARNE Archive Search :: Browse the Archive :: By Collection FARNE - Folk Archive Resource North East
wordsnavigationcolumn Online version of The Pitman's Pay
 The Bards of Newcastle
 Wor Geordie dialect – the songwriters

1773 births
1858 deaths
English male poets
People from Gateshead
Writers from Tyne and Wear
English singers
English songwriters
Geordie songwriters